A hippodrome was an ancient Grecian horse and chariot racing course and arena. Hippodrome or Hipódromo may also refer to:

Geography 
Hipódromo (Asunción), a district of Asunción, Paraguay 
 Hippodrome, Bamako, a quartier of Bamako, the capital of Mali
Covered Hippodrome, part of the Great Palace of Constantinople in Istanbul, Turkey
 Hippodrome of Constantinople (Greek: Ἱππόδρομος τῆς Κωνσταντινουπόλεως, romanized: Hippódromos tēs Kōnstantinoupóleōs), a circus that was the sporting and social centre of Constantinople, capital of the Byzantine Empire; today a square named Sultanahmet Meydanı (Sultan Ahmet Square) in Istanbul, Turkey, with a few fragments of the original structure surviving.
 Roman Hippodrome of Beirut, an historic Jewish quarter of Beirut, Lebanon

Arenas and entertainment venues

Argentina

 Hipodromo Argentino de Palermo, a horse racing venue in Buenos Aires
 Hipódromo de San Isidro, a horse racing track in San Isidro, Buenos Aires

Belgium

 Hippodrome Wellington, a horse racing track in Ostend

Canada

 Hippodrome de Montréal, now Blue Bonnets (raceway)

Estonia

 Tallinna Hipodroom, a harness racing track in Tallinn

France

 Auteuil Hippodrome, a horse-racing venue in Paris
 Hippodrome de Pantin, a former circus and concert venue in Paris
 Hippodrome de Vincennes, used for horse racing and pop music concerts
 Hippodrome de Chantilly, see Chantilly Racecourse
 Hippodrome Deauville-La Touques, see Deauville-La Touques Racecourse
 Hippodrome de Longchamp, see Longchamp Racecourse
 Hippodrome de Marseille Borely, see Marseille Borely Racecourse

Lebanon

 Hippodrome du parc de Beyrouth, also known as Beirut Hippodrome, a horse racing facility

Romania

 Craiova Hippodrome, an equestrian facility in the Nicolae Romanescu Park in Craiova

Russia

 Central Moscow Hippodrome, a horse racing track in Moscow

Slovenia

 Ljubljana Hippodrome, a horse racing stadium in Ljubljana

Turkey

 Adana Yeşiloba Hippodrome, a racetrack in Seyhan, Adana

United Kingdom
The Hippodrome, a demolished theatre in Aldershot in Hampshire 
 Aston Hippodrome, a demolished theatre in Aston, Birmingham
 Birmingham Hippodrome, a theatre in Birmingham
 Brighton Hippodrome, an entertainment venue in Brighton and Hove, currently in disuse
 Bristol Hippodrome, a theatre in Bristol
 Dudley Hippodrome, a former theatre in Dudley, West Midlands
 Golders Green Hippodrome, a former BBC building in North London
 Great Yarmouth Hippodrome, a venue in Norfolk, and Britain's only surviving total circus building; one of three in the world
 Hippodrome Cinema, Bo'ness, Falkirk
 Hulme Hippodrome, a theatre in Manchester
 Playhouse Theatre, Manchester, once used as a recording venue by the BBC, has also been known as the Hulme Hippodrome
 Hippodrome, London, now a casino; but had other uses during the building's existence
 Kensington Hippodrome, a former race course in Notting Hill, London
 Pendle Hippodrome Theatre, in Colne, Lancashire
 Queen's Park Hippodrome, a demolished theatre in Harpurhey, Manchester
 Royal Hippodrome Theatre, a theatre in Eastbourne
 Southend Hippodrome, (latterly Gaumont Cinema), a demolished theatre in Southend, UK, see Bertie Crewe
 Hippodrome Theatre (formerly the Gordon Theatre, Stoke-on-Trent) a demolished theatre in Staffordshire
 Tameside Hippodrome, a theatre in Ashton-under-Lyne, Greater Manchester

United States

 Hippodrome Theatre (Baltimore), a theatre in Maryland
 Hippodrome Theater (Cleveland, Ohio), now demolished
 Hippodrome State Theatre, Gainesville, Florida
 New York Hippodrome (1905–1939), a demolished theatre
 Great Roman Hippodrome (New York), later Madison Square Garden (I), now demolished
 Hippodrome Theater (Richmond, Virginia)
 Hippodrome Theatre (Terre Haute, Indiana)
 Julia Sanderson Theater, Springfield, Massachusetts, once a nightclub known as the Hippodrome
 Hippodrome (Waco, Texas), listed on the NRHP in Texas
 McElroy Auditorium, Waterloo, Iowa, also known as the Hippodrome
  North Augusta Hippodrome, North Augusta, South Carolina
 Hippodrome Memphis, Tennessee 500 Beale St. Skating rink then music venue, demolished. 
 Santa Monica Looff Hippodrome, a carousel on the Newcomb Pier, Santa Monica
 Shea's Hippodrome Theatre, Buffalo, NY (1914-1983) renamed Center Theatre

Venezuela

 La Rinconada Hippodrome, a race track in Coche, Caracas